This article contains information about the literary events and publications of 1659.

Events
January 27 – The poet Andrew Marvell is elected a member of Parliament for Kingston upon Hull in England's Third Protectorate Parliament.
August – William Davenant is briefly imprisoned for his part in George Booth's Cheshire uprising in favor of restoring the English Monarchy.
unknown dates
Méric Casaubon edits John Dee's journal of angel magic.
The Icelandic pastor Jón Magnússon completes his Píslarsaga (Passion Saga, or Story of My Sufferings).

New books

Prose
Richard Baxter – The Holy Commonwealth
Méric Casaubon (ed.) – A True & Faithful Relation of What passed for many Yeers between Dr. John Dee (A Mathematician of Great Fame in Q. Eliz. and King James their Reignes) and some spirits
Thomas Hobbes – 
Christiaan Huygens – 
Ninon de l'Enclos –  (The Flirt Avenged)
Richard Lovelace –  Lucasta (posthumous)
William Prynne – Parliamentary Writs (further parts in 1660, 1662 and 1664)
Johann Heinrich Rahn – Teutsche Algebra
Péter Révay – 
John Rushworth – Historical Collections of Private Passages of State... (also The Rushworth Papers)
Anna Maria van Schurman – The Learned Maid, or Whether a Maid May Be a Scholar? (English version of 1638 Latin original)
Jeremy Taylor – Discourse on the Nature, Offices and Measures of Friendship

Drama
Anonymous – The London Chanticleers
Richard Brome – Five New Plays, including The English Moor, The Lovesick Court, The Weeding of Covent Garden, The New Academy, and The Queen and Concubine
Joan Leonardsz Blasius – 
Sir William Davenant – The History of Sir Francis Drake
John Day and Henry Chettle – The Blind Beggar of Bethnal Green (published six decades after its premiere)
Richard Flecknoe – The Marriage of Oceanus and Britannia
Molière – 
Walter Montague – The Shepherd's Paradise
Agustín Moreto – No puede ser...
James Shirley
The Contention of Ajax and Ulysses
Honoria and Mammon
Juan Bautista Diamante –

Poetry

William Chamberlayne – 
Luis de Ulloa Pereira – Versos

Births
January 1 – Humphrey Hody, English theologian and archdeacon (died 1707)
March – Margrethe Lasson, Danish novelist (died 1738)
March 25 – John Asgill, English pamphleteer (died 1738)
March 26 – William Wollaston, English philosopher, classicist and cleric (died 1724)
April 29 – Sophia Elisabet Brenner, Swedish poet and writer (died 1730)
unknown dates
Thomas Creech, English classicist and translator (died 1700)
Kata Szidónia Petrőczy, Hungarian poet (died 1708)

Deaths
January 7 – Laurenz Forer, Swiss theologian and controversialist writing in Latin and German (born 1580)
January 31 – János Apáczai Csere, Hungarian linguist, mathematician and encyclopedist (born 1625)
February 4 – Francis Osborne, English essayist (born 1593)
April 15 – Simon Dach, German poet and hymnist (born 1605)
June 3 – Morgan Llwyd, Welsh preacher, poet and writer (born 1619)
September 22 – Thomas Morton, English polemicist and bishop (born 1564)
October 27 – Giovanni Francesco Busenello, Italian poet and librettist (born 1598)

References

 
Years of the 17th century in literature